The 1984 All-Ireland Senior Club Camogie Championship for the leading clubs in the women's team field sport of camogie was won for the fourth year in succession by Buffers Alley from Wexford who defeated Killeagh from Cork) in the final, played at Monamolin. It was the fourth title in a row won by the club.

Arrangements
The championship was organised on the traditional provincial system used in Gaelic Games since the 1880s, with Glenamaddy and Leitrim Fontenoys from Down winning the championships of the other two provinces. Marion Sweeney, Patricia Fitzgibbon and Anne Leahy scored Killeagh’s goals in their victory over Leitrim. Elsie Cody, Gertrude O'Leary and Bridie Doran scored Buffers Alley’s goals in their semi-final victory over Glenamaddy, while Kitty Hoey and Kathleen Garvey scored Glenamaddy’s goals.

The Final
Gertrude O'Leary’s goal secured a comeback victory for Buffers Alley in the final.

Final stages

References

External links
 Camogie Association

1984 in camogie
1984